This is a timeline of the development of radio in Northern Ireland.

1970s
 1975
 1 January – BBC Radio Ulster is launched, and becomes the first full-time radio station for Northern Ireland. It replaces what had been an opt-out of BBC Radio 4 (previously the BBC Northern Ireland Home Service) and launches as a result of the BBC's widely regarded under-reporting of the UWC Strike in May 1974.

 1976
 16 March – Independent Local Radio begins in Northern Ireland when Downtown Radio starts broadcasting.

 1977
 No events.

 1978
 No events.

 1979
 11 September – BBC Radio Foyle launches as an opt-out station from BBC Radio Ulster.

1980s

 1980
 No events.

 1981
 No events.

 1982
 No events.

 1983
 Plans for a station, Northside Sound, in the Derry region collapse.

 1984
 No events.

1985
 No events.

 1986
 1 October – Downtown Radio's broadcast area is expanded when it begins broadcasting to the north western area of Northern Ireland.

 1987 
 Late in 1987, Downtown Radio begins broadcasting to the Enniskillen and Omagh areas of Northern Ireland and to coincide with its expanded broadcast area, the station rebrands itself as 'DTRFM' to reflect that it now broadcasts to wider areas of Northern Ireland.

 1988
24 November – BBC Radio 1 starts broadcasting on FM in Belfast.

 1989
 No events.

1990s
 1990
7 February – Cool FM begins broadcasting to Belfast on FM. Downtown Radio continues on MW in Belfast and on FM across Northern Ireland.
6 April – Belfast Community Radio launches.
4 June – CityBeat begins broadcasting to Belfast.

 1991
 No events.

 1992
 Belfast Community Radio adopts a classic hits format and renames itself as Classic Trax BCR.

 1993
 No events.

 1994
 Classic Trax BCR relaunches as 96.7 BCR.

 1995
 Townland Radio begins broadcasting on 828 kHz in Cookstown, Northern Ireland. 

 1996
Radio 1521 launches. Broadcasting from Craigavon, the station covers much of mid-Ulster.
30 September – Belfast Community Radio closes and is replaced by CityBeat.

 1997
 Townland Radio is relaunched as Goldbeat.

 1998
Radio 1521 is relaunched as Heartbeat 1521.

 1999
22 May –  Goldbeat and Heartbeat 1521 close down and both AM licences are handed back to the then UK regulator The Radio Authority
19 August – BBC Radio 1 broadcasts its first split programming when it introduces weekly national new music shows for Scotland, Wales and Northern Ireland. The Session in Northern Ireland is presented by Colin Murray and Donna Legge.

2000s
 2000
26 January – Q97.2, fully known as Q97.2 Causeway Radio, begins broadcasting to the Coleraine area of Northern Ireland.

 2001
 No events.

 2002
19 March – Q101.2 begins broadcasting to Omagh and Enniskillen.
After years of campaigning by locals for the re-advertising of a radio licence for Mid-Ulster, Ofcom awards an FM licence for the area to Belfast CityBeat and launches the station as Mid FM.

 2003
1 February – Mid 106 FM begins broadcasting across mid Ulster.
 

 2004
No events.

2005
14 November – U105 launches as a music and speech station covering Belfast-based radio station

2006
 Mid FM is rebranded to 6FM.
 15 September – Raidió Fáilte launches as an Irish-language community radio station, broadcasting from Belfast. Previously the station had operated as a pirate radio station.

 2007
 CityBeat becomes available in North Belfast, Newtownabbey and Carrickfergus and later in the year, another FM transmitter opens, covering the Bangor area.

 2008 
 No events.

 2009
 Belfast-based community station Blast 106 launches.

2010s
 2010
26 July – The BBC announces a trial scheme under which BBC Radio Foyle would be available on DAB as a part-time sidecar station to Radio Ulster, using a similar format as the part-time longwave-programming optouts of BBC Radio 4 on the BBC National DAB multiplex. During this trial, the bitrate of Radio Ulster drops during Foyle's separate broadcast hours, with Foyle carried as a split audio stream in the remaining space; outside of split shows, the full bitrate would revert to Radio Ulster.

 2011
 November – 6FM is rebranded to 6FM in 2006 and changed name again to Q106.7 FM.

2012
 28 June – Community station Lisburn's 98FM launches.
 December – Downtown Radio opens a small studio in Derry ahead of the city’s year of being UK City of Culture. It remains open and in use, mainly at the weekend with presenter-led programming on Saturday afternoon and Sunday covering a range of events in the region.

2013
26 July – Digital radio is switched on in Northern Ireland allowing a further 1.4 million listeners to hear stations such as Smooth 70s, Absolute Radio 90s and Jazz FM.

2014
 No events.

2015
6 July – Fuse FM Ballymoney launches as a full time community station. Fuse FM is the UK's first radio station in the UK which serves the Ulster Scots Community.
9 August – The Q Radio Network launches. The network covers seven licence areas including Belfast which sees Citybeat subsumed into the new network.

2016
No events.

2017
No events.

2018
 No events.

2019
 No events.

2020s
2020
 No events.

2021
6 May – BBC Radio Ulster and BBC Radio Foyle stop broadcasting on MW.

2022
 No events.

See also
Timeline of radio in London
Timeline of radio in Manchester
Timeline of radio in Scotland
Timeline of radio in Wales

References

Radio in Northern Ireland